The Removing Wardrobe was a sub-department of the British Royal Household. It was responsible for looking after the furnishings which travelled from palace to palace. The office was headed by the Yeoman of the Removing Wardrobe (a sinecure office), assisted by two grooms and three pages, all appointed by the Lord Chamberlain. The department was abolished in 1782.

Yeomen of the Removing Wardrobe
1660–1662: Clement Kinnersley
1662–1674: Luke Wilkes
1674–1689: Philip Kinnersley
1689–1693: T. Sackville
1693–1707: Peter Hume
1708–1710: George Davenant
1710–1743: Hon. G. Maynard (and Keeper of the Standing Wardrobe at St. James's Palace)
1743–1782: James Calthorpe

Sources
Bucholz, R. O. - Office-Holders in Modern Britain: Volume 11 (revised)

Positions within the British Royal Household
1782 disestablishments in Great Britain